Hena Maes-Jelinek (1929 – 8 July 2008) was a Czech-born Belgian literary scholar. She has been called "one of the founding mothers of the study of Commonwealth Literature and, later, Postcolonial studies in Europe", who "pioneered the study of Caribbean literature in Belgium and Europe". She wrote extensively on the Guyanese writer Wilson Harris.

Tribute was paid to her in a collection entitled The Cross-Cultural Legacy: Critical and Creative Writings in Memory of Hena Maes-Jelinek (edited by Gordon Collier, Geoffrey V. Davis, Marc Delrez and Bénédicte Ledent; Brill, 2016), with contributors including Alastair Niven, Fred D'Aguiar, Wilson Harris, Louis James, Karen King-Aribisala, Alecia McKenzie, Caryl Phillips, Lawrence Scott, Stephanos Stephanides and Janet Wilson, and many others.

Works
 Criticism of Society in the English Novel between the Wars, 1971
 The Naked Design, 1976
 Wilson Harris, 1982
 (ed.) Wilson Harris: The Uncompromising Imagination, 1991
 The Labyrinth of Universality, 2006

References

1929 births
2008 deaths
Literary scholars
Postcolonial literature
Belgian people of Czech descent